Pedro Formental (April 19, 1915 – September 15, 1992) was a Cuban professional baseball outfielder in the Mexican League, Negro leagues and in the Cuban League. He played from 1943 to 1955 with several teams. He was selected to the 1949 East-West All-Star Game. Formental also played in the 1951, 1952, and 1953 Caribbean Series.

References

External links
 and Seamheads
NLBPA.com

1915 births
1992 deaths
People from Báguanos
Cuban expatriates in the United States
Habana players
Havana Sugar Kings players
Memphis Red Sox players
Mexican League baseball players
Oakland Oaks (baseball) players
Tuneros de San Luis Potosí players
Baseball outfielders